Rotimi Salami  is a Nollywood actor and film producer, he is a receiver of Africa Magic Viewers' Choice Awards (AMVCA).

Early life and education
He is a native of Lagos State and a graduate of sociology from Lagos State University. He also holds a Diploma Certificate from the New York Film Academy.

Career
He started acting in 2007 where he featured in his first movie, Unknown Revenge, and later ventured into television series. His first movie as a director is a television series called Kuti's career Palace.

Personal life
He got married in 2015 to Jumoke Salami and they are blessed with two children.

Filmography
He has featured in various series like Tinsel, Superstory, Silent Night, About to Wed, Dear Mother, Kuti's Career Palace, Emerald, Alan Poza, Bella's Place, Leave My Boyfriend, 11th Hour, Papa Ajasco and Crack in the Wall; and various movies:
Omoye (2017)
Shadow Parties (2021)
Just Not Married (2016)
Mirage (2019)
Divorce Not Allowed (2018)
Fate of Alakada (2020)
The Lost Heir (2018)
Diary of a Crazy Nigerian Woman (2017)
More Than Just Four Letters (2020)
Timeless (2017)
African Queen (2018)
Unbroken (2012)
Lugard (2021)
Stormy Hearts (2017)
The Miracle Center (2021)
The Oap (2017)
Mentally (2017)
Rancor (2016)
Enemy Within (1994)
A Night Before (2015)
Hey You (2022)

References

Living people
Nigerian film directors
Nigerian film actors
Nigerian film producers
Yoruba male actors
21st-century Nigerian actors
Lagos State University alumni
20th-century Nigerian actors
Actors in Yoruba cinema
Year of birth missing (living people)
New York Film Academy alumni
Nigerian media personalities